Christian August Pohlenz (3 July 1790 – 10 March 1843) was a German composer and conductor.

Pohlenz was born in Sallgast.  He was Gewandhaus Kapellmeister from 1827 to 1835.  He died in Leipzig.

References

External links
 
 

1790 births
1843 deaths
People from Elbe-Elster
German conductors (music)
German male conductors (music)
19th-century German musicians
19th-century German male musicians